The 2017 Pan American Table Tennis Championships is the first edition of the championships, and were held in Cartagena de Indias, Colombia from September 11 to September 17, 2017.

Medal summary

Events

Medal table

See also
Latin American Table Tennis Championships
North American Table Tennis Championships

References

Pan American Table Tennis Championships
Pan American Table Tennis Championships
Pan American Table Tennis Championships